Valentin Adrian Velcea (born 5 September 1973 in Sadova) is a retired Romanian football midfielder and manager.

Club career

Politehnica Timișoara
Velcea started football in Timișoara and made a name for himself while at Politehnica.  He was a very technical midfielder with good passing and long shots.

He stayed at the club most of his career, swapping to Gloria Bistriţa in 1999 where he scored three goals, before returning to the Politehnica Timișoara in 2004. He retired after being deemed a surplus to the team requirements by Gheorghe Hagi in 2006.

Coaching career

Politehnica Timișoara
Velcea was assistant manager from 2006 to 2009 when he was promoted to Politehnica II Timișoara before he returned as assistant in 2010 after poor results.

He also was two times caretaker manager and plays two Cupa României finals after Alin Artimon resigned and Gabi Balint was sacked just one week before the final. However, Velcea loses both finals, first 0–2 at home against Rapid București in 2007 and the other one in 2009 at Tudor Vladimirescu stadium 3–0 against CFR Cluj.

Although Politehnica Timișoara finished on the second place in the 2010–11 Liga I, the team was relegated to Liga II after the license necessary to play in the first division was denied by Romanian Football Federation and Dušan Uhrin, Jr. left the team in July, and Velcea was appointed the new manager of the team on 4 August 2011.

Coaching stats

Honours

Player
Politehnica Timișoara
Liga II (1): 1994–95

Coach

FC Politehnica Timișoara
Liga II (1): 2011–2012
ACS Poli Timișoara
Liga II Runner-up (1): 2012–13

References

External links

Official FCPT profile

1973 births
Living people
Romanian footballers
Romanian football managers
Liga I players
Liga II players
FC Politehnica Timișoara players
FC CFR Timișoara players
FC UTA Arad players
ACF Gloria Bistrița players
FC Politehnica Timișoara managers
ACS Poli Timișoara managers
Association football midfielders
People from Dolj County